Joseph Hubert Diss Debar (6 March 1820 – 13 January 1905) was a French-born American artist and government official who designed the official seal and coat-of-arms for the state of West Virginia in 1863. Many of his sketches of early West Virginia figures and scenes survive.

Biography

Youth, emigration, and settlement in America
Diss Debar was born in Strasbourg, in the Alsace region of France, in 1820. The son of Francis Joseph Diss Debar — the estate manager for Cardinal Prince de Rohan — he was educated at schools in Strasbourg, Colmar, Muhlhausen and Paris. He is said to have emigrated to the United States in 1842 on board the same ship as Charles Dickens, whom he met and sketched. His move was occasioned by his pursuit of his intended, Clara Levassor (1829-1849) — then a mere 13 years old — whose family had settled in Parkersburg, Virginia on the Ohio River.

Land agent
Diss Debar was hired in 1846 by John Peter Dumas of Paris as agent for a 10,000-acre tract on Cove Creek in newly created Doddridge County, Virginia. (This was part of a major land-holding covering several counties in the north central part of the state which was known as the Swan Lands; it had been acquired by Boston financier James Swan (1754-1830) before 1809 and comprised 1,079,724 acres of then-unappropriated lands originally purchased for 2 cents an acre.) In 1847 Diss Debar  married Clara at Marietta, Ohio. He was 27, she 17. On April 29, 1849, she died in childbirth, survived by a son, Joseph Henry Diss Debar Jr. Her parents, the Levassors, took charge of the baby, raising him in Cincinnati. (This son lived to be a very old man, but left no heirs.) 

Now a widower, Diss Debar moved to Doddridge County himself, where he bought a tract where he settled a German-Swiss colony near the village of Leopold. He called his settlement Saint Clara for his late wife. In 1859, Diss Debar married a second time, to a local woman, Amelia Cain (1825-1909), who bore him five children. He did surveying and continued acting as agent for the land company.

The State Seal
In 1863, West Virginia became a state (separate from Virginia) and the brand new state legislature appointed Diss Debar to make preliminary drawings for a state seal and coat-of-arms. His design was adopted in September of that year. At this time Diss Debar began to be quite prominent in state politics.

The seal devised by Diss Debar is 2.5 inches in diameter and bears the motto Montani Semper Liberi (Latin, "Mountaineers Always Free"). The images are symbolic representations of the state, its people and industries. The two figures standing on either side of the rock marking the state's date of foundation ("June 20, 1863") indicate the people and their occupations. The plow-handles and the axe indicate the cultivation (wheat and cornstalks are also depicted) after clearing of the original forests. Mineral wealth is indicated by the miner, his pick, and the lumps of coal at his feet. The crossed rifles with liberty cap in the foreground represent liberty maintained by force of arms. (The reverse side, rarely displayed, depicts emblematic objects typical of West Virginia's landscape, productions, resources, and natives grouped inside an encircling wreath of laurel and oak.)

Later years
Governor Boreman appointed Diss Debar commissioner of immigration in 1864 in which capacity he recruited labor and landowners from abroad until the end of his term in 1871. He was a member of the House of Delegates representing Doddridge in 1864 and he prepared, compiled and published the first The West Virginia Hand-Book and Immigrant's Guide (1870). Politically, he supported the Liberal Republicans in their efforts to come to terms with ex-Confederates in ending Radical Reconstruction within the state by 1872. During his 29 years living in what is now West Virginia, he produced numerous sketches of the people and places of the era.
The elderly Diss Debar left West Virginia and moved to Pennsylvania. He died in Pittsburgh in 1905 and is interred at West Laurel Hill Cemetery in Bryn Mawr, Pennsylvania.

Personal
Diss Debar is said to have been fluent in French, German and English, semi-fluent in Spanish and Italian, and able to translate Latin and Greek. His characteristic Van Dyke beard, cloak and high silk hat, and the habitual twirling of his cane are said to have made him instantly recognizable.

A notorious medium and fraudster — Swami Laura Horos (ca. 1849–ca. 1909) — falsely claimed for a time to have been married to Diss Debar. Madam "Ann O'Della Diss Debar" was known to have visited the Diss Debar home in Parkersburg many times and outwardly appeared to be a relative or family friend. Diss Debar is reported to have participated in some of her schemes, including posing as her husband, but they turned against each other during a court case. She had 1 or 2 children with Diss Debar.

Works
"For the Benefit of the Catholic Hospital and Orphan Asylum of Wheeling, Virginia, Distribution of Farm Lots in St. Clara Colony, Doddridge County, Virginia, A Chance of a Home for One Dollar", Wheeling, Virginia, n.d. 
"Two Men; Old John Brown and Stonewall Jackson of World-Wide Fame, Some Interesting Reminiscences by a Man Who Knew Both", Clarksburg, Clarksburg Telegraph, 1874.
"The West Virginia Handbook and Immigrant's Guide. A Sketch of the State of West Virginia", Parkersburg, Gibbens Bros., 1870.
"Prohibition; its Relation to Temperance, Good Moral and Sound Government", Cincinnati, 1910.

Sketch gallery

References

Citations

Other sources
Earl, Jesse A., "The life of Joseph H. Diss Debar and His Reminiscences of Doddridge County, 1883", West Virginia History, Charleston, WV, v. 28, 1966-1967, pp. 228–40.
Maurer, B. "St. Johannes Evangelical Lutheran Church", St. Clara, WV. n.p. 1984.
Stutler, Boyd B., "Joseph H. Diss Debar - Prophet, Colonizer". West Virginia Review, (Dec. 1931). 
Wilson, Donald Edward, "Joseph H. Diss Debar in West Virginia.", M.A. thesis, West Virginia University, 1961.

External links

Sketches by Joseph H. Diss Debar at the West Virginia Division of Culture and History.

Artists from Strasbourg
American illustrators
1820 births
1905 deaths
Burials at West Laurel Hill Cemetery
People of West Virginia in the American Civil War
Artists from West Virginia
French emigrants to the United States